Ian E. Wilson  (born April 1943) is a former chief Librarian and Archivist of Canada. Appointed in 2004, he had previously (as of July 1999) been National Archivist of Canada. With Roch Carrier, the then National Librarian, he developed and led the process to link the National Archive and National Library as a unified institution. His distinguished career has included archival and information management, university teaching and government service. In addition, he has published extensively on history, archives, heritage, and information management and has lectured both nationally and abroad. Wilson retired as head of LAC in April 2009.

Life and work
Born in Montreal, Quebec, he attended the Collège militaire royal de Saint-Jean and obtained a master's degree from Queen's University in 1974. He began his career at Queen's University Archives (1967), later becoming Saskatchewan's Provincial Archivist (1976–86) and Chairman of the Saskatchewan Heritage Advisory Board. He was appointed Archivist of Ontario in 1986, a position he held until 1999. For several years he was also responsible for the Ontario Public Library system.

Wilson chaired the Consultative Group on Canadian Archives on behalf of the Social Sciences and Humanities Research Council. The Group's report, Canadian Archives - generally known as the "Wilson Report" - was published in 1980 and has been described as "a milestone in the history of archival development in Canada."

As a librarian and archivist, he serves on the Service Transformation Advisory Committee of the Treasury Board of Canada and was appointed their Information Management co-Champion for the Government of Canada in 2002. He is also a member of the Historic Sites and Monuments Board of Canada. He has taught as an Adjunct Professor in the Faculties of Information Studies and Graduate Studies of the University of Toronto.

He was responsible for repatriating the Winkworth Collection to Canada in 2008.

Awards and recognition
He served as President of the Ontario Historical Society (1975–1976) and more recently was President of the Champlain Society from 1995 to 2003, and Vice-President of the International Council on Archives from 2000 to 2004. (Ian E. Wilson, https://www.ica.org/en/ian-e-wilson-0 (2022.01.16)

In 2001, he was awarded an Honorary Doctorate of Letters (D. Litt.) from York University in recognition of his contribution to Canadian archives. In 2002, he became member of the Order of Canada. In 2003, he was elected Fellow of the Society of American Archivists and appointed Commandeur de l'Ordre des Arts et des Lettres by the Government of France. In 2009 Wilson became a Fellow of the Association of Canadian Archivists, an honour bestowed upon him at the ACA conference held in Calgary, Alberta. In 2019, Wilson was appointed as an Officer of the Order of Canada.

References

1943 births
Living people
Anglophone Quebec people
Canadian librarians
Officers of the Order of Canada
People from Montreal
Royal Military College of Canada alumni